The Rise was a five-piece American band from Austin, Texas. Their sound is a combination of metalcore, hardcore techno, post-hardcore and metal. The band is currently signed to ReIgnition Recordings and their latest album, Reclamation Process, was released on as a free album for subscribers of Law of Inertia, the rock mag product of Cory Killduff. on May 31, 2005. They toured constantly in 2001–2004, and from their inclusion on the Hellfest 2002 compilation DVD.

Band members

Last lineup 
 Kemble Walters – drums (Now plays in Volume. He has also played in the bands Juliette and the Licks and Vise Versa.)
 Cory Kilduff – vocals/electronics
 Danny Wood – bass (Also plays in the bands …And You Will Know Us by the Trail of Dead and The AM Syndicate.)
 Ben Hicks – guitar
 Stuart Reilly – guitar

Former members 
 James Welsh – electronics
 Colin Fee – drummer on Signal to Noise

Discography

Albums 
2002: Signal to Noise
2005: Reclamation Process

DVDs 
 Hellfest 2002

References

External links 
 Official website
 ReIgnition profile
 Ferret Records profile

Musical groups from Austin, Texas
Metalcore musical groups from Texas
Musical groups established in 2001
2001 establishments in Texas
Ferret Music artists